Ronald "Ron" Duane Severa (born August 13, 1936) is an American water polo player who competed in the 1956 Summer Olympics and in the 1960 Summer Olympics.

He was born in Munden, Kansas.

Severa was a member of the American water polo team which finished fifth in the 1956 tournament. He played three matches.

Severa attended Compton College and the University of Southern California.  He was on the water polo team at the later institution.

Four years later he finished seventh with the American team in the 1960 tournament. He played all seven matches and scored four goals.

Severa was also a member of two USA Pan American teams. He won a gold medal in the 1959 games in Chicago, IL, and a silver medal in the 1963 games in São Paulo, Brazil.

In 1977, Severa was inducted into the USA Water Polo Hall of Fame. He was inducted into the USC Hall of Fame in 2007.

References

External links
 

1936 births
Living people
American male water polo players
El Camino College Compton Center alumni
USC Trojans men's water polo players
Olympic water polo players of the United States
Water polo players at the 1956 Summer Olympics
Water polo players at the 1960 Summer Olympics
People from Republic County, Kansas
American water polo coaches